Trins is a municipality in the district of Innsbruck-Land in the Austrian state of Tyrol located 20.3 km south of Innsbruck on the Gschnitzbach. The village was mentioned for the first time in 1030, as “Trunnes”. Formerly a part of the village Gschnitz, Trins became a separate municipality in 1811.

Population

Media
Location shooting for the film The Last Valley occurred in Trins.

References

Cities and towns in Innsbruck-Land District